The 1968 United States presidential election in the District of Columbia took place on November 5, 1968, as part of the 1968 United States presidential election. District of Columbia voters chose three representatives, or electors, to the Electoral College, who voted for president and vice president.

Vice President Hubert Humphrey won Washington, D.C. by an overwhelming margin, receiving over 80% of the vote.

This was the second presidential election in which the District of Columbia had the right to vote in presidential elections, as well as the only place where George Wallace did not have his name on the ballot. This remains the only presidential election in which the Republican nominee received a higher percentage of the vote in DC than at least one state in that same election as Nixon performed 5% better in Washington, D.C. than he did in both Mississippi and Alabama.

Results

See also
 United States presidential elections in the District of Columbia

Notes

References

Washington, D.C.
1968
United States pres